Diana is an unincorporated community in Bratt's Lake Rural Municipality No. 129, Saskatchewan, Canada. The community was located between the town of Rouleau and Wilcox on Highway 39 about 25 km north of the town of Milestone. There currently is a population of 0 residents living in Diana as of 2011, thus making it a ghost town.

See also

 List of communities in Saskatchewan
 List of ghost towns in Saskatchewan

Bratt's Lake No. 129, Saskatchewan
Unincorporated communities in Saskatchewan
Ghost towns in Saskatchewan
Division No. 6, Saskatchewan